The palatal hook is a type of hook diacritic formerly used in the International Phonetic Alphabet to represent palatalized consonants. It is a small, leftwards-facing hook joined to the bottom-right side of a letter, and is distinguished from various other hooks indicating retroflexion, etc. It was withdrawn by the IPA in 1989, in favour of a superscript j following the consonant (i.e.,  becomes ).

However, versions with the hook have also been used and are supported by Unicode.

Palatal hooks are also used in Lithuanian dialectology by the Lithuanian Phonetic Transcription System (or Lithuanian Phonetic Alphabet) and in the orthography of Nez Perce.

Computer encoding
Unicode includes both a combining character for the palatal hook, as well as several precomposed characters, including superscript letters with palatal hooks.

While LATIN SMALL LETTER T WITH PALATAL HOOK has been in Unicode since 1991, the rest were not added until 2005 or later. As such, font support for the latter characters is much less than for the former.

References

Hook, palatal
Phonetic transcription symbols